Alfred Nicol was an English professional footballer who played as a winger. He played nine matches in the Football League.

References

English footballers
Association football midfielders
Burnley F.C. players
Gainsborough Trinity F.C. players
English Football League players
Year of death missing
Year of birth missing